The Bismarck black myzomela (Myzomela pammelaena) or ebony myzomela, is a species of bird in the Meliphagidae or honeyeater family.
It is native to the Admiralty and St Matthias islands (Bismarck Islands, Papua New Guinea).

Its natural habitat is subtropical or tropical moist lowland forests.

References

Myzomela
Birds of the Admiralty Islands
Birds of New Ireland Province
Birds described in 1877
Taxonomy articles created by Polbot